South Mecklenburg High School is a public secondary school located in Charlotte, North Carolina. It is part of the Charlotte Mecklenburg School District. Locally it is known as "South Meck" (or simply just "South"). Its mascot is the Sabre and the school colors are red, black, and white.

The attendance boundary includes Pineville.

Faculty 
Several South Meck teachers and counselors hold National Board Certification, with many more working towards certification. The faculty teacher pages can be found on South Meck High School's web page.

Athletics 

The South Mecklenburg Sabres are affiliated with the North Carolina High School Athletic Association (NCHSAA) and compete in the 4A division, which is North Carolina's highest classification. Currently, South Meck is in the So. Meck 8 4A League conference. South Meck has had many State Championship teams, as well as Individual State Champion athletes. Below are sports that South Meck has to offer for its students.

 Football
 Cross Country
 Cheerleading
 Soccer
 Field Hockey
 Swimming & Diving
 Basketball
 Tennis
 Track & Field
 Golf
 Lacrosse
 Volleyball
 Wrestling
 Baseball
 Softball
 Rugby

Notable alumni 
 John Brannon, NFL cornerback
 Ricky Berens, former USA Olympic swim team member and 2x gold medalist in the  freestyle
 Joy Cheek, WNBA player
 Stu Cole, former MLB player with the Kansas City Royals
 Carlos Crawford, former MLB player with the Philadelphia Phillies
 Walter Davis, 6x NBA All-Star and member of the gold medal-winning 1976 USA men's Olympic basketball team
 Grace Glenn, artistic gymnast
 Anthony Hamilton, singer/songwriter and record producer
 Vani Hari, author, activist and food critique, who blogs as the Food Babe
 Wayne Hearn, professional tennis player
 John Hoogenakker, actor
 Bobby Jones, NBA Hall of Famer, 4x NBA All-Star and silver medalist with the 1972 USA men's Olympic basketball team
 Peter Joseph Jugis, fourth bishop of Roman Catholic Diocese of Charlotte
 Lew Massey, professional basketball player
 David Mims, former NFL offensive tackle
 Kristin Normann, legal scholar and judge in the Supreme Court of Norway
 Roman Phifer, former NFL linebacker and member of three Super Bowl championship teams with the New England Patriots
 Dan Shaver, racecar driver and entrepreneur
 Austin Yearwood, professional soccer player

See also 
 List of high schools in North Carolina

References

External links 
 

Schools in Charlotte, North Carolina
Public high schools in North Carolina